The following is a list of squads for each national team which competed at the 2018 AFC U-23 Championship. The tournament took place in China, between 9–27 January 2018. It was the third U-23 age group competition organised by the Asian Football Confederation. As the tournament was not held during the FIFA International Match Calendar, clubs were not obligated to release the players.

The sixteen national teams involved in the tournament were required to register a squad of 23 players, including three goalkeepers. Only players in these squads were eligible to take part in the tournament. Players born on or after 1 January 1995 were eligible to compete in the tournament.

The full squad listings are below. The age listed for each player is on 9 January 2018, the first day of the tournament. The nationality for each club reflects the national association (not the league) to which the club is affiliated. A flag is included for coaches who are of a different nationality than their own national team. Players in boldface have been capped at full international level at some point in their career.

Group A

China PR 
Coach:  Massimiliano Maddaloni

The final squad was announced on 4 January 2018.

Qatar 
Coach:  Félix Sánchez Bas

The final squad was announced on 1 January 2018.

Uzbekistan 
Coach: Ravshan Khaydarov

The final squad was announced on 4 January 2018.

Oman 
Coach: Hamad Al-Azani

The final squad was announced on 31 December 2017.

Group B

Japan 
Coach: Hajime Moriyasu

The final squad was announced on 26 December 2017.

North Korea 
Coach: Ju Song-Il

Thailand 
Coach:  Zoran Janković

The final squad was announced on 1 January 2018.

Palestine 
Coach: Ayman Sandouqa

The final squad was announced on 31 December 2017.

Group C

Iraq 
Coach: Abdul-Ghani Shahad

The final squad was announced on 3 January 2018.

Jordan 
Coach:  Iain Brunskill

The final squad was announced on 27 December 2017.

Saudi Arabia 
Coach:  Daniel Teglia

The final squad was announced on 30 December 2017.

Malaysia 
Coach: Ong Kim Swee

The final squad was announced on 29 December 2017.

Group D

South Korea 
Coach: Kim Bong-gil

The final squad was announced on 5 January 2018.

Australia 
Coach: Ante Milicic

The final squad was announced on 19 December 2017.

Syria 
Coach: Mohand Al Faqir

The final squad was announced on 1 January 2018.

Vietnam 
Coach:  Park Hang-seo

The final squad was announced on 30 December 2017.

References

2018 AFC U-23 Championship